Christopher Harris "Kit" Williams (December 18, 1798 – November 27, 1857) was an American politician who represented Tennessee's United States House of Representatives, thirteenth and United States House of Representatives, eleventh districts in the United States House of Representatives.

Biography
Williams was born near Hillsborough, North Carolina, on December 18, 1798. He pursued an academic course and attended the University of North Carolina at Chapel Hill. He studied law, was admitted to the bar about 1820, and practiced law. He married Jane Allison on December 9, 1819.

Career
Williams was elected as a Whig to the Twenty-fifth, Twenty-sixth, and Twenty-seventh Congresses by Tennessee's thirteenth district. He served from March 4, 1837 to March 3, 1843.  He was an unsuccessful candidate for re-election in 1842 to the Twenty-eighth Congress.

After the number of districts held by Tennessee had been reduced, Williams was elected by Tennessee's eleventh district to the Thirty-first and Thirty-second Congresses. He served from March 4, 1849 to March 3, 1853.  He was not a candidate for renomination in 1852. He resumed the practice of law in Lexington, Tennessee.

Death
Williams died in Lexington on November 27, 1857. He is interred at Lexington Cemetery.

Williams' son and namesake (born 1830) was a Colonel in the Confederate army in the American Civil War who was killed at the Battle of Shiloh in 1862. His grandson was John Sharp Williams, who also served in the American House and Senate.

References

External links

 

1798 births
1857 deaths
Whig Party members of the United States House of Representatives from Tennessee
19th-century American politicians
People from Lexington, Tennessee